Motherwell and Wishaw may mean or refer to:

 Former burgh of Motherwell and Wishaw, Lanarkshire, Scotland; see Motherwell and Wishaw
 Motherwell and Wishaw (UK Parliament constituency)
 Motherwell and Wishaw (Scottish Parliament constituency)